The following outline is provided as an overview of and topical guide to Brazil:

Brazil – largest country in both South America and the Latin America region. It is the world's fifth largest country, both by geographical area, 8.5 million km², and by population, with over 206 million people. It is the largest lusophone country in the world, and the only one in the Americas.

General reference

 Pronunciation: 
 
 Common English country name:  Brazil
 Official English country name:  The Federative Republic of Brazil
 Common endonym: Brasil
 Official endonym: República Federativa do Brasil
 Adjectival and denomynic:  Brazilian
 Etymology: Name of Brazil
 International rankings of Brazil
 ISO country codes: BR, BRA, 076
 ISO region codes: See ISO 3166-2:BR
 Internet country code top-level domain: .br

Geography of Brazil 

Geography of Brazil
 Brazil is: a megadiverse country
 Location:
Western Hemisphere, on the Equator
 South America
 Latin America
 Time zones:
UTC-02: Fernando de Noronha, Trindade and Martin Vaz, Atol das Rocas, Saint Peter and Paul Rocks
 
 UTC-03: Alagoas, Amapá, Bahia, Ceará, Distrito Federal, Espírito Santo, Goiás, Maranhão, Minas Gerais, Pará, Paraíba, Paraná, Pernambuco, Piauí, Rio de Janeiro, Rio Grande do Norte, Rio Grande do Sul, Santa Catarina, São Paulo, Sergipe, Tocantins
 
 UTC-04: Amazonas, Mato Grosso, Mato Grosso do Sul, Rondônia, Roraima
UTC-05: Acre
 Extreme points of Brazil
 High:  Pico da Neblina 
 Low:  Atlantic Ocean 0 m
 Land boundaries:  16,885 km
 3,423 km
 2,995 km
 2,200 km
 1,644 km
 1,606 km
 1,365 km
 1,261 km
 1,068 km
 730 km
 593 km
 Coastline:  7,491 km
 Population of Brazil: 207,350,000 (2017) - 5th most populous country

 Area of Brazil:  - 5th largest country
 Atlas of Brazil

Environment of Brazil 

Environment of Brazil
 Climate of Brazil
 Ecoregions in Brazil
 Environmental issues in Brazil
 Protected areas of Brazil
 Biosphere reserves in Brazil
 Renewable energy in Brazil
 Wildlife of Brazil
 Flora of Brazil
Endangered flora of Brazil
 Fauna of Brazil
 Birds of Brazil
 Mammals of Brazil

Natural geographic features of Brazil 

 Islands of Brazil
 Lakes of Brazil
 Mountains of Brazil
 Volcanoes in Brazil
 Rivers of Brazil
 Waterfalls of Brazil
 World Heritage Sites in Brazil

Regions of Brazil 

Regions of Brazil

Statistical regions 

 North Region
 Northeast Region
 Central-West Region
 Southeast Region
 Southern Region

Socio-geographic divisions 

Amazônia Legal
Centro-Sul
Nordeste

Ecoregions of Brazil 

List of ecoregions in Brazil

Administrative divisions of Brazil 

Administrative divisions of Brazil
 States of Brazil
 Municipalities of Brazil

States of Brazil 

States of Brazil

Municipalities of Brazil 

Municipalities of Brazil
 Capital of Brazil: Brasília
 Cities of Brazil

Demography of Brazil 

Demographics of Brazil
For demographics data, see chart presented under "States of Brazil", above.

Government and politics of Brazil 

Politics of Brazil
 Form of government: federal presidential representative democratic republic
 Capital of Brazil: Brasília
 Elections in Brazil
 Political parties in Brazil

Branches of government

Government of Brazil

Executive branch of the government of Brazil 
 Head of state and Head of government: President of Brazil
 Cabinet of Brazil

Legislative branch of the government of Brazil 

 National Congress of Brazil (bicameral)
 Upper house: Senate of Brazil
 Lower house: Chamber of Deputies of Brazil

Judicial branch of the government of Brazil 

Court system of Brazil

State-level judiciary 

 Trial courts
 Courts of Justice of Brazil

Federal-level judicial branch 

Federal courts of Brazil
Supreme Federal Court

Superior courts 

 Superior Court of Justice
 Superior Labor Court
 Superior Electoral Court

Second instance Courts 

 Regional Labor Courts
 Regional Electoral Courts
 Regional Federal Courts

First instance courts 

 Brazil Labor Courts
 Brazil Electoral Courts
 Brazil Federal Courts
 Brazil Military Courts

Foreign relations of Brazil 

Foreign relations of Brazil
 Diplomatic missions in Brazil
 Diplomatic missions of Brazil

International organization membership 
The Federative Republic of Brazil is a member of:

African Development Bank Group (AfDB) (nonregional member)
Agency for the Prohibition of Nuclear Weapons in Latin America and the Caribbean (OPANAL)
Andean Community of Nations (CAN) (associate)
Bank for International Settlements (BIS)
Central American Integration System (SICA) (observer)
Comunidade dos Países de Língua Portuguesa (CPLP)
Food and Agriculture Organization (FAO)
Group of 15 (G15)
Group of 24 (G24)
Group of 77 (G77)
Group of Twenty Finance Ministers and Central Bank Governors (G20)
Inter-American Development Bank (IADB)
International Atomic Energy Agency (IAEA)
International Bank for Reconstruction and Development (IBRD)
International Chamber of Commerce (ICC)
International Civil Aviation Organization (ICAO)
International Criminal Court (ICCt)
International Criminal Police Organization (Interpol)
International Development Association (IDA)
International Federation of Red Cross and Red Crescent Societies (IFRCS)
International Finance Corporation (IFC)
International Fund for Agricultural Development (IFAD)
International Hydrographic Organization (IHO)
International Labour Organization (ILO)
International Maritime Organization (IMO)
International Mobile Satellite Organization (IMSO)
International Monetary Fund (IMF)
International Olympic Committee (IOC)
International Organization for Migration (IOM)
International Organization for Standardization (ISO)
International Red Cross and Red Crescent Movement (ICRM)
International Telecommunication Union (ITU)
International Telecommunications Satellite Organization (ITSO)
International Trade Union Confederation (ITUC)
Inter-Parliamentary Union (IPU)

Latin American Economic System (LAES)
Latin American Integration Association (LAIA)
Multilateral Investment Guarantee Agency (MIGA)
Nonaligned Movement (NAM) (observer)
Nuclear Suppliers Group (NSG)
Organisation for the Prohibition of Chemical Weapons (OPCW)
Organization of American States (OAS)
Permanent Court of Arbitration (PCA)
Rio Group (RG)
Southern Cone Common Market (Mercosur)
União Latina
Union of South American Nations (UNASUR)
United Nations (UN)
United Nations Conference on Trade and Development (UNCTAD)
United Nations Educational, Scientific, and Cultural Organization (UNESCO)
United Nations High Commissioner for Refugees (UNHCR)
United Nations Industrial Development Organization (UNIDO)
United Nations Institute for Training and Research (UNITAR)
United Nations Integrated Mission in Timor-Leste (UNMIT)
United Nations Mission for the Referendum in Western Sahara (MINURSO)
United Nations Mission in Liberia (UNMIL)
United Nations Mission in the Central African Republic and Chad (MINURCAT)
United Nations Mission in the Sudan (UNMIS)
United Nations Operation in Cote d'Ivoire (UNOCI)
United Nations Peacekeeping Force in Cyprus (UNFICYP)
United Nations Stabilization Mission in Haiti (MINUSTAH)
Universal Postal Union (UPU)
World Confederation of Labour (WCL)
World Customs Organization (WCO)
World Federation of Trade Unions (WFTU)
World Health Organization (WHO)
World Intellectual Property Organization (WIPO)
World Meteorological Organization (WMO)
World Organisation for Animal Health (OIE)
World Tourism Organization (UNWTO)
World Trade Organization (WTO)

Law and order in Brazil 

Law of Brazil
 Capital punishment in Brazil
 Constitution of Brazil
 Corruption in Brazil
 Crime in Brazil
 Human rights in Brazil
 LGBT rights in Brazil
 Freedom of religion in Brazil
 Law enforcement in Brazil
 List of scandals in Brazil

Military of Brazil 

Military of Brazil
 Command
Commander-in-chief: President of Brazil, Luiz Inácio Lula da Silva
Ministry of Defence of Brazil
 Forces
 Army of Brazil
 Navy of Brazil
 Air Force of Brazil
 Military history of Brazil
 Military ranks of Brazil

Local government in Brazil 

Local government in Brazil

History of Brazil 

 Colonial Brazil
 Kingdom of Brazil
 United Kingdom of Portugal, Brazil and the Algarves
 Empire of Brazil
 First Brazilian Republic
 Vargas Era
 Second Brazilian Republic
 Brazilian military government
 Economic history of Brazil
 Military history of Brazil

Culture of Brazil 

Culture of Brazil
 Architecture of Brazil
 Architecture schools in Brazil
 Cuisine of Brazil
 Languages of Brazil
 National symbols of Brazil
 Coat of arms of Brazil
 Flag of Brazil
 National anthem of Brazil
 People of Brazil
 Austrian Brazilians
 English Brazilians
 German Brazilians
 Italian Brazilians
 Japanese Brazilians
 Swiss Brazilians
 Prostitution in Brazil
 Public holidays in Brazil
 Religion in Brazil
 Buddhism in Brazil
 Christianity in Brazil
 Hinduism in Brazil
 Islam in Brazil
 Judaism in Brazil
 World Heritage Sites in Brazil

Art in Brazil 
 Brazilian art
 Cinema of Brazil
 Literature of Brazil
 Music of Brazil
 Television in Brazil

Sports in Brazil 

Sports in Brazil
 Football in Brazil
 Brazil at the Olympics

Economy and infrastructure of Brazil 

Economy of Brazil
 Economic rank, by nominal GDP (2016): 9th (ninth)
 Agriculture in Brazil
 Banking in Brazil
 Bank of Brazil
 Communications in Brazil
 Internet in Brazil
 Latin America and Caribbean Network Information Centre
 Companies of Brazil
Currency of Brazil: Real
ISO 4217: BRL
 Economic history of Brazil
 Energy in Brazil
 Energy policy of Brazil
 Health care in Brazil
 Industry in Brazil
 Mining in Brazil
 São Paulo Stock Exchange
 Tourism in Brazil
 Transport in Brazil
 Airports in Brazil
 Rail transport in Brazil
 Water supply and sanitation in Brazil

Education in Brazil 

Education in Brazil

Health in Brazil 

Health in Brazil
MORHAN: Movimento de Reintegração das Pessoas Atingidas pela Hanseníase, Movement of Reintegration of Persons Afflicted by Hansen's disease

See also

Brazil

List of Brazil-related topics
List of international rankings
Member state of the Group of Twenty Finance Ministers and Central Bank Governors
Member state of the United Nations
Latin America
Outline of South America

References

External links

 Government and administration
Brazilian Federal Government
Chamber of Deputies
 Federal Senate
Presidency of Brazil 

 Information and statistics
Brazilian Institute of Geography and Statistics
Brazil. The World Factbook. Central Intelligence Agency.
 Institute of Applied Economics Research
National Bank for Social and Economical Development
U.S. Library of Congress

 Economy and business
Brazilian Central Bank
Brazilian-American Chamber of Commerce
Britcham in Brazil
São Paulo Stock Exchange

 Tourism and sports
Accommodation in Brazil 

 Sport in Brazil
Tourism in Brazil

 Non-Governmental Organizations
Assistance to Rio de Janeiro Favelas

 
 
Brazil